Jonathan Michie  (born 25 March 1957, London, England) is a British economist who is president of Kellogg College, Oxford, where he is professor of innovation and knowledge exchange.

Early life
Michie is the son of the biologist Dame Anne McLaren and computer scientist Donald Michie, and brother of the academic psychologist Susan Michie.

Academic career
Michie studied at United World College of the Atlantic from 1973 where he gained his International Baccalaureate. He then gained a scholarship to Balliol College, Oxford, where he gained first class honours in Philosophy, Politics and Economics, and later a doctorate, after having obtained an MSc in Economics (with Distinction) from Queen Mary, University of London. In 1983 he moved to the Economics Department of the Trades Union Congress and then in 1988 to Brussels as an Expert to the European Commission, before becoming an academic at the University of Cambridge in 1990. After seven years at Cambridge – first in the Economics Faculty and then the Judge Business School – he took up the Sainsbury Chair of Management at the University of London, where he was head of the School of Management & Organizational Psychology at Birkbeck College.

In 2004, he became a professor of management at the University of Birmingham where he was director of the Birmingham Business School and a member of the University Council. He was also a non-executive director of the Sandwell & West Birmingham Hospitals NHS Trust.

In December 2007, he was appointed to the joint positions of Director of Oxford University Department for Continuing Education and President of Kellogg College, Oxford. He stood down as director of the department in 2021.

Michie authored a report which called for Northern Rock to be remutualised, and heads the Commission for Ownership set up at Oxford University.

Michie was appointed Officer of the Order of the British Empire (OBE) in the 2022 New Year Honours for services to education.

Shareholders United
Michie was one of the first chairpersons of Shareholders United, formerly Shareholders United Against Murdoch, a not-for-profit organisation dedicated to promote fan ownership in Manchester United Football Club. They successfully thwarted Rupert Murdoch's attempt to take over Manchester United. When his term as chair passed in 2004, Shareholders United had over 30,000 members and owned 1% of Manchester United. The organisation is now known as the Manchester United Supporters' Trust.

Personal life
He is married to Carolyn Downs and they have a son and a daughter.

References

External links
 Jonathan Michie home page

Innovation economists
1957 births
Living people
Alumni of Balliol College, Oxford
Alumni of Queen Mary University of London
Academics of Birkbeck, University of London
Academics of the University of Birmingham
Academics of the University of Cambridge
Presidents of Kellogg College, Oxford
English economists
People educated at Atlantic College
People educated at a United World College
McLaren family
Michie family
Officers of the Order of the British Empire